Jere Michael (born May 17, 1977) is an American former competitive figure skater. He is the 1997 Piruetten bronze medalist, 1994 World Junior bronze medalist, and 1994 U.S. national junior champion. Early in his career, he was coached by Brian Wright and Christy Krall. He represented the Broadmoor Figure Skating Club in Colorado Springs, Colorado, before moving to the University of Delaware Figure Skating Club. His coaches in Newark, Delaware were Jeff Degrigorio and Ron Ludington.

Michael co-coached Megan Williams-Stewart and Courtney Hicks.

Programs

Results

References

External links
 Jere Michael performing a combination flying camel, sit spin with-leg-behind-body, back cross foot spin

American male single skaters
1977 births
Living people
World Junior Figure Skating Championships medalists
Sportspeople from Aspen, Colorado